County Road 178 ( or Fv178) runs between Eltonåsen in Nannestad and Jessheim in Ullensaker, Norway. Prior to 1 January 2010, the road was a national road, but after reclassification, it became a county road.

178
178
Roads in Nannestad
Roads in Ullensaker